Events in the year 1934 in Spain.

Incumbents
President: Niceto Alcalá-Zamora
Prime Minister: 
 until 29 April: Alejandro Lerroux 
 29 April-5 October: Ricardo Samper
 starting 5 October: Alejandro Lerroux

Events
January 9–11: founding of SEPU (Sociedad Española de Precios Únicos, S.A.) in Barcelona
February 12–13: Juntas de Ofensiva Nacional-Sindicalista merges with Falange Española to form Falange Española de las Juntas de Ofensiva Nacional-Sindicalista
May 19: founding of Tomiño FC
October 4–19: Asturian miners' strike of 1934
October 6: Events of October 6th in Catalonia, where a republic was declared
founding of CE Alaior
founding of Bertamiráns FC
founding of CD Condal
creation of Spain national basketball team

Births
18 February - Paco Rabanne, fashion designer (died 2023)
26 March - Macià Alavedra, Spanish politician (died 2018)
7 April - Antonio Ruiz-Pipò, pianist and composer (died 1997)
16 April - Vicar, cartoonist (died 2012)
7 May - Miguel Irízar Campos, Roman Catholic bishop in Peru (died 2018)
6 August – Landelino Lavilla, Spanish politician (died 2020)
7 September - Manuel Cardona, physicist (died 2014)
1 October - Emilio Botín, Spanish banker (died 2014)
2 October - Olegario González de Cardedal, Catholic theologian and author
14 November - Juan Ramón Lacadena, Spanish agronomical engineer

Deaths
1 August - Elías García Martínez, painter (born 1858)

See also 

List of Spanish films of the 1930s

References 

 
1930s in Spain
Years of the 20th century in Spain